James L. Van Engelenhoven (September 8, 1943 – September 20, 2021) was an American politician, serving as the Iowa State Representative from the 71st District. He had served in the Iowa House of Representatives since 1999, when he was elected to represent the 95th district. In addition to winning re-election in general election challenges, Van Engelenhoven had won three primary elections (1998, 2008, and 2010), though he went one year (2004) without any primary or general election opponents.

, Van Engelenhoven served on several committees in the Iowa House, includinf the Ethics, Local Government, Natural Resources, and Transportation committees. His prior political experience included serving as County Supervisor in Mahaska County from 1992-1998. He died in 2021 at the age of 78.

Electoral history
*incumbent

References

External links

 
 Representative Jim Van Engelenhoven official Iowa General Assembly site
 
Profile at Iowa House Republicans

1943 births
2021 deaths
Republican Party members of the Iowa House of Representatives
People from Oskaloosa, Iowa
County supervisors in Iowa